Xestia collina is a moth of the family Noctuidae. It is found in the Alps, from southern France to southern Poland, Romania, from southern Finland and Estonia to the Urals, Siberia and northern Mongolia.

The wingspan is 27–33 mm. Adults are on wing from the end of June to mid July.

The larvae feed on Vaccinium, Rubus, Plantago and Achillea species.

External links
Fauna Europaea
lepidoptera.pl

collina
Moths of Europe
Moths of Asia